is a Japanese professional basketball player for Rizing Zephyr Fukuoka of the B.League in Japan. The Japanese Olympic Committee penalized Nagayoshi and three players for buying sex in Jakarta and sent them back home on August 20, 2018. They have been suspended from official competition for one year.

Career statistics 

|-
| align="left" | 2014-15
| align="left" | Toshiba
| 51|| || 12.1|| .397|| .280|| .638|| 1.7|| 0.4|| 0.2|| 0.1||  2.7
|-
| align="left" | 2015-16
| align="left" | Toshiba
| 54|| 29|| 15.7|| .438|| .200|| .511|| 2.4|| 0.9|| 0.5|| 0.1||  3.3
|-
| align="left" |  2016-17
| align="left" | Kawasaki
| 60|| 1|| 15.1|| .532|| .400|| .795|| 2.1|| 0.7|| 0.2|| 0.1||  4.5
|-
| align="left" |  2017-18
| align="left" | Kyoto
| 57|| 56|| 26.5|| .411|| .343|| .681|| 3.9|| 1.6|| 0.5|| 0.2|| 8.2
|-

References

1991 births
Living people
Japanese men's basketball players
Kyoto Hannaryz players
Sportspeople from Kagoshima Prefecture
Kawasaki Brave Thunders players
Basketball players at the 2018 Asian Games
Asian Games competitors for Japan
Centers (basketball)
People from Kagoshima